Dancin' Days is a Portuguese soap opera (telenovela) which began airing on SIC in June 2012.

Cast
Joana Santos – Júlia Matos
Soraia Chaves – Raquel Corte-Real 
Joana Ribeiro – Mariana Corte-Real
Albano Jerónimo – Duarte Sousa Prado de Oliveira
Alexandre de Sousa – Zé Maria Corte-Real

Plot 
Dancin' Days is a remake of a Brazilian telenovela of the same name which aired in 1978–1979. The plot starts with Júlia (Santos) being imprisoned for a crime which her sister Raquel (Chaves) committed after a New Year's Eve party. In prison, Júlia becomes pregnant and leaves her daughter, Mariana (Ribeiro), with her sister. From then on the three are confronted with many problems, but also become more and more united.

References

2012 Portuguese television series debuts
2013 Portuguese television series endings
Portuguese telenovelas
2012 telenovelas
Sociedade Independente de Comunicação telenovelas
Portuguese-language telenovelas